Auschwitz is a 2011 German drama film directed by Uwe Boll.

Plot
The film attempts to depict the harsh reality of the process inside the Auschwitz concentration camp by using brutal imagery. Book-ended by documentary footage as well as interviews with German teenagers about what they know about the Holocaust, Boll's intention is to show viewers just how depraved and sadistic life in the camp was.

Cast

Production 
Boll shot the film in 2010 from February to March in Zagreb, Croatia.  Auschwitz was filmed on the set of BloodRayne: The Third Reich.

Release 
The film premiered on 13 February 2011 in Berlin. A number of critics boycotted the release "for being "too gruesome".

Boll also filed a lawsuit against the Berlin International Film Festival (the Berlinale) in 2011 as he objected to paying the €125 entry fee, stating "I don't believe the Berlinale handles all films fairly. Kosslick has his deals with the major studios and invites his old pals from the Filmstiftung days. There isn't fair competition".

Notes

External links
 
 

2011 films
2010s German-language films
German drama films
2011 drama films
Holocaust films
Films shot in Croatia
Films directed by Uwe Boll
Auschwitz concentration camp
German prison films
2010s German films